Corda may refer to:

People
 August Carl Joseph Corda (1809–1849), Czech physician and mycologist
 María Corda (1898–1976), Hungarian actress and novelist

Other uses
 CORDA (UK), a consultancy company
 Corda, Ribeira Grande, a settlement in the island of Santo Antão, Cape Verde
 Corda River, a river in Maranhão state in northeastern Brazil
 Corda or strappado, a form of torture

See also
 Sursum Corda (disambiguation)
 Korda, a surname
 Cordas, a surname